The 3rd Cavalry Corps (Russian, 3-й кавалерийский корпус) was a cavalry corps in the Imperial Russian Army.

Composition
10th Cavalry Division
1st Don Cossack Division
2nd Combined Cossack Division (1915–1916)
12th Cavalry Division (1916–1917)

Part of
4th Army: 1914–1915
9th Army: 1915
6th Army: 1915
4th Army: 1916–1917
11th Army: 1917
1st Army: 1917

Commanders
General F. A. Keller: 1915–1917
Lieutenant General Aleksandr Krymov: 1917
Lieutenant General N. L. Junakov: 1917
Major General Pyotr Krasnov: 1917

References
 A. K. Zalesskij I mirowaja wojna. Prawitieli i wojennaczalniki. Wyd. WECZE Moskwa 2000.

Corps of the Russian Empire